Bianca – Wege zum Glück (Bianca – Ways to Happiness) was the first German telenovela, developed by the TV production company Grundy UFA. It started on 1 November 2004 and ran until 5 October 2005 on the ZDF. The main characters were Bianca Berger, played by Tanja Wedhorn, and Oliver Wellinghoff, played by Patrik Fichte.

See also
List of German television series

External links
 

2004 German television series debuts
2005 German television series endings
ZDF telenovelas
German telenovelas
German-language television shows